Aleksandr Lvovich Chikhradze (born 17 August 1975) is a Russian football coach and a former football goalkeeper of Georgian origin. He is the goalkeeping coach with FC Fakel Voronezh.

He was born in Nalchik, and spent much of his career at PFC Spartak Nalchik.

Honours
 Russian Second Division, Zone South best goalkeeper: 2009.

References

External links
 

1975 births
Living people
Sportspeople from Nalchik
Russian footballers
Association football goalkeepers
Russian expatriate footballers
PFC Spartak Nalchik players
FC Dinamo Tbilisi players
FC Luch Vladivostok players
FC Zhemchuzhina Sochi players
Russian Premier League players
Russian people of Georgian descent
FC Chernomorets Novorossiysk players
FC Orenburg players
FC MVD Rossii Moscow players